Yagobie is a locality on the Inverell railway line in north-western New South Wales, Australia. It was a site of a railway station and tank opened in 1900 and closed in 1975. The area takes its name from a cattle station established in 1844 and later subdivided. The Gwydir River flows through the area, and a low level road crossing was constructed in the late 1930s.

References

Regional railway stations in New South Wales
Railway stations in Australia opened in 1900
Railway stations closed in 1975